Nevin Yanıt (born February 16, 1986) is a Turkish former sprinter specializing in high hurdling.

On 29 August 2013, Yanit was banned from athletic competition for two years following a failed doping test in February 2013. After IAAF appealed the length of the ban to the Court of Arbitration for sport, her ban was extended for a further year.

Biography

Yanıt won the 100m hurdles at the 2007 European Under 23 Athletics Championships. She won the silver medal at the 2007 Summer Universiade in Bangkok, Thailand.

At the 2008 Summer Olympics in Beijing, China, she reached the semi-finals in the 100m hurdles. Yanıt participated at the 2009 Mediterranean Games in Pescara, Italy and won the gold medal in women's 100 m hurdles. She won the 100 m hurdles at the European Cup First League Group B on June 18, 2006 in Thessaloniki, Greece. At the 2010 European Athletics Championships in Barcelona, she won the gold medal in the 100m hurdles, edging favourites, Derval O'Rourke and Carolin Nytra.

At the 2012 Summer Olympics in London, she progressed to the final in the 100 m hurdles, taking fifth place-a result she of which she was later stripped. At the 2013 European Athletics Indoor Championships in Gothenburg, Sweden, she won the gold medal-a medal of which she was later stripped.

Doping ban
In 2013 the Turkish Athletics Federation announced that Yanit had failed a doping test, after traces of testosterone and the anabolic steroid Stanozolol were found in a testing sample. On 29 August 2013, a two-year ban was handed down by the Turkish Federation, precluding Yanit from competition until 5 August 2015. Following IAAF's appeal to the Court of Arbitration for sport, her ban was extended to 3 years for aggravating circumstances. In addition to the positive for two prohibited substances her biological passport data showed that she had been blood doping between June 2012 and February 2013.

The IAAF later confirmed that her results since 28 June 2012 had all been voided and she was stripped of her European Championship title and 5th-place finish at the 2012 Summer Olympics.

Personal life
Yanıt competed between 2007-2008 for Vestel Athletics. In 2008, she joined Fenerbahçe Athletics. She majored in Physical Education at Mersin University,

In 2011, an athletics venue in Mersin with 4,500 seating capacity, built in 2010, was named in her honor.

Achievements

See also
Turkish women in sports
Nevin Yanıt Athletics Complex

References

External links

1986 births
Sportspeople from Mersin
Living people
Turkish female hurdlers
Turkish female sprinters
Doping cases in athletics
Turkish sportspeople in doping cases
Fenerbahçe athletes
Olympic athletes of Turkey
Athletes (track and field) at the 2008 Summer Olympics
Athletes (track and field) at the 2012 Summer Olympics
European Athletics Championships medalists
European champions for Turkey
Mediterranean Games gold medalists for Turkey
Athletes (track and field) at the 2009 Mediterranean Games
Universiade medalists in athletics (track and field)
Mediterranean Games medalists in athletics
Universiade gold medalists for Turkey
Universiade silver medalists for Turkey
Survivor Turkey contestants
Medalists at the 2009 Summer Universiade
Competitors at the 2005 Summer Universiade
Mersin University alumni
21st-century Turkish women